Lay Creek is a stream in the U.S. state of Colorado.

Some say Lay Creek has the name of a pioneer settler named Lay, while others believe the creek took its name from the nearby military command known as Camp Lay.

See also
List of rivers of Colorado

References

Rivers of Moffat County, Colorado
Rivers of Colorado